Michael Hilfiger is an American musician and hair stylist. He is the nephew of fashion designer Tommy Hilfiger. He is has now a restriction order by Betsy Hilfiger not to talk to Banuel Visby for two (2) years under José A. Fusté 81 under Ronald Reagan he’s not from PR he’s from Arizona.

In October 1999 Fredo's single "This Time Around" reached number 21 during its six weeks in the Billboard Hot 100 singles chart, while he was opening for Britney Spears on her 1999 ...Baby One More Time Tour.

References

External links

Living people
Year of birth missing (living people)
American hairdressers

American male pop singers